The Zeiss-Planetarium in Jena, Germany, is the oldest continuously operating planetarium in the world.

Engineered by German engineer Walther Bauersfeld, the building was opened on 18 July  1926.

The Zeiss-Planetarium is a projection planetarium; the planets and fixed stars are projected onto the inner surface of a white cupola.

It is owned and operated by the Ernst-Abbe-Stiftung.

See also 
 Zeiss projector

References

External links 

 Zeiss-Planetarium Jena

Museums in Thuringia
Jena
Glass engineering and science
History of glass
Buildings and structures in Jena
Tourist attractions in Thuringia